Southeast Asians living in the United Kingdom have been present in the country for several centuries, arriving from Southeast Asia, and primarily originating from countries and territories such as the Philippines, Malaysia, Indonesia, Burma, Singapore, Thailand and Vietnam.

Population history
Southeast Asian is not a category used in official statistics in the United Kingdom, but has been considered as a particular ethnic identity, including by the Foreign and Commonwealth Office, and Southeast Asians have been studied academically as a distinct group.

The country had a small population of Filipinos, Singaporeans and Malaysians until the late 20th century. The number started to grow in the 1970s after the passage of the Commonwealth Immigrants Act and its amendment in 1968 which curtailed extensive rights to immigrate to the UK for Commonwealth citizens. This Act had the effect of more immigration from non-Commonwealth countries, such as the Philippines.

The 2001 UK Census recorded 9,924 Burmese-born people residing in the United Kingdom.

In media
In 2008, ABS-CBN reported that acting parts in the British Film Industry were rare for Southeast Asian British people.

Subgroups
Southeast Asians
Burmese
Filipinos
Indonesians
Malaysians
Singaporeans
Thais
Vietnamese

See also
 British East and Southeast Asian
 East Asians in the United Kingdom
 Asian Americans
 Asian Canadians
 Asian Australians
 Asian New Zealanders
 British Asian

References

External links

Asian diaspora in the United Kingdom
British people of Southeast Asian descent